Ali Collins (born 27 May 2000) is a British tennis player.

Collins has a career-high doubles ranking of world No. 118, achieved on 20 February 2023.

She made her WTA Tour main-draw debut at the 2022 Birmingham Classic, in the doubles draw, partnering Emily Appleton.

ITF Circuit finals

Singles: 1 (runner-up)

Doubles: 14 (8 titles, 6 runner-ups)

References

External links
 
 

2000 births
Living people
British female tennis players
21st-century British women